New Caledonia competed at the  2017 Asian Indoor and Martial Arts Games held in Ashgabat, Turkmenistan from September 17 to 27. New Caledonia sent a delegation of 2 competitors for bowling event.

They couldn't receive any medal at the Games.

New Caledonia along with other Oceania nations competed in the Asian Indoor and Martial Arts Games for the first time in history despite the suspension of the IOC of New Caledonia.

Participants

See also 
 New Caledonia at the 2011 Pacific Games
 New Caledonia at the 2015 Pacific Games

References 

Nations at the 2017 Asian Indoor and Martial Arts Games
2017 in New Caledonian sport
New Caledonia at multi-sport events